Manolis Skoufalis (born 21 August 1978) is a Greek football player who plays as a midfielder for Thesprotos F.C. He has made a name for himself in Greek football as an attacking-minded player with a flashy playing style, who usually plays on the right wing.

Career
Born in Nea Ionia, Skoufalis began playing football with Doxa Vyronas F.C.

External links
 Official Panionios profile
Profile at Onsports.gr

Association football fullbacks
1978 births
Living people
A.P.O. Akratitos Ano Liosia players
A.O. Kerkyra players
Kozani F.C. players
Panionios F.C. players
Athinaikos F.C. players
PAS Giannina F.C. players
Doxa Vyronas F.C. players
Footballers from Athens
Greek footballers